The Anglican Diocese of Akure is one of twelve within the Anglican Province of Ondo, itself one of 14 provinces within the Church of Nigeria: the current bishop is Simeon Borokini.

Notes

Dioceses of the Province of Ondo
 
Akure